Hans-Georg Fehn (16 September 1943 – 6 June 1999) was a German water polo player. He competed in the men's tournament at the 1968 Summer Olympics.

See also
 List of men's Olympic water polo tournament goalkeepers

References

External links
 

1943 births
1999 deaths
German male water polo players
Water polo goalkeepers
Olympic water polo players of East Germany
Water polo players at the 1968 Summer Olympics
People from Dessau-Roßlau
Sportspeople from Saxony-Anhalt